The women's tournament of Ice hockey at the 2003 Asian Winter Games at Misawa, Japan, was held from 30 January to 5 February 2003.

Results
All times are Japan Standard Time (UTC+09:00)

The game between was called after 23:46 minutes after South Korean players refused to continue the game.

Final standing

References

External links
Official website
JIHF

Women